Morelos is one of the 38 municipalities of Coahuila, in north-eastern Mexico. The municipal seat lies at Morelos. The municipality covers an area of 606.2 km². As of 2005, the municipality had a total population of 1,516.

History

Geography

Adjacent municipalities
Zaragoza Municipality  (north)
Nava Municipality (northeast)
Allende Municipality (southeast)
Sabinas Municipality (south)
San Juan de Sabinas Municipality (southwest)
Múzquiz Municipality (west)

Major highways
 Mexican Federal Highway 29
 Coahuila State Highway 10

References

Municipalities of Coahuila